Juan Carlos Muñoz (4 March 1919 – 22 November 2009) was a footballer from Argentina who played as a right winger for River Plate, from 1939 to 1950, playing 184 games and scoring 39 goals. He started playing professionally for Sportivo Dock Sud in 1938. and he was sold in June 1939 to River Plate. He was part of the team known as La Máquina ("the machine") which dominated Argentine football in the 1940s, and was also a member of the Argentina national team that won three South American Championships during the same decade. During his time at River Plate he won 4 titles and is considered one of their greatest ever players. After a very successful time at River Plate He moved to Platense, from 1951 to 1953, where he played in 39 games making 3 goals.

Muñoz played 11 times for the Argentina national team scoring two goals, he was part of the squad that won Copa América 1945. He never played in the FIFA World Cup because the best part of his career coincided with the Second World War.

After retiring as a player Muñoz went on to become the manager and then president of Club Atlético Platense.

Death
On 22 November 2009, Muñoz died in Buenos Aires due to a heart attack.

Honours

Club

 River Plate
Primera División Argentina: 1941, 1942, 1945, 1947

International
 Argentina 
Copa América: 1945

References

External links
 

1919 births
2009 deaths
Argentina international footballers
Argentine football managers
Argentine footballers
Club Atlético Platense footballers
Club Atlético Platense managers
Association football wingers
Sportspeople from Avellaneda
Club Atlético River Plate footballers
Argentine Primera División players